Robert John Buckley (FRCO), was born 14 July 1847 at Monaghan, Ireland was an English music critic, composer and author. He died 26 December 1938 at his home in Sandford road, Moseley.

Buckley was married thrice and had seven children.  One of his children was film critic, writer, actor and BBC radio personality and Television presenter F. R. Buckley.

Organist

He was also organist at Holy Trinity, Bordesley and St Mary's Church, Whittall Street, Birmingham
In 1887 he began writing for the Sunday Mercury, a series of short articles titled ‘’Pulpit and Pew’’ about popular contemporary preachers and it ran for 27 years

Chess
Buckley was the Librarian of the Birmingham Chess Club and wrote a chess column for the Sheffield Weekly Independent from October 1891 through at least 1893. and edited a column on chess in the Birmingham Weekly Mercury from 1889 to 1907

Music Critic
Buckley was the music critic for the Birmingham Gazette from 1886 to 1926 when he retired.  He had become known as "the doyen of music critics".

Works
1904 "Sir Edward Elgar"
"Ireland As It Is"
1902 "The Master Spy""
1912 "Granville Bantock: A Famous Musician at Home" The Pall Mall Magazine Vol. L July to September
1910 The Nation's Music Vol. 1 English.
1910 The Nation's Music Vol. 2 Scotch.
1910 The Nation's Music Vol. 3 Irish
1910 The Nation's Music: Vol. 4 Welsh
1910 The Nation's Music. Vol. 5 Sacred.

References

External links 

1847 births
1938 deaths
English music critics
English male journalists
People from Monaghan (town)
People from Moseley